Polyandromyces is a genus of fungi in the family Laboulbeniaceae. This is a monotypic genus, containing the single species Polyandromyces coptosomatis.

References

External links
Polyandromyces at Index Fungorum

Laboulbeniomycetes
Monotypic Laboulbeniomycetes genera